Lieutenant-General Aung Lin Dwe (born 31 May 1962) is a Burmese military officer who is the secretary of Myanmar's State Administration Council. He was appointed on 2 February 2021, in the aftermath of the 2021 Myanmar coup d'état. He was also the Judge Advocate General of Tatmadaw and the secretary to the Peace Negotiation Committee.

Early life and education 
Aung Lin Dwe was born on 31 May 1962. He graduated from the Defense Services Academy in 1984 as part of the 25th intake.

Military career 
From 2015 to 2016, he was the commander of the Western Command, which encompasses Rakhine and Chin States. He was forced to retire from military service in January 2022, but retained a seat in the State Administration Council.

Sanctions 
The U.S. Department of the Treasury has imposed sanctions on "Aung Lin Dwe" since 11 February 2021, pursuant to Executive Order 14014, in response to the Burmese military's coup against the democratically elected civilian government of Burma. The US sanctions include freezing of assets in the US and ban on transactions with US person.

The Government of Canada has imposed sanctions on him since 18 February 2021, pursuant to Special Economic Measures Act and Special Economic Measures (Burma) Regulations, in response to the gravity of the human rights and humanitarian situation in Myanmar (formerly Burma). Canadian sanctions include freezing of assets in Canada and a ban on transactions with Canadian persons.

HM Treasury and the Foreign, Commonwealth and Development Office of the United Kingdom have imposed sanctions on him since 25 February 2021, for his responsibility for serious human rights violations in Burma. The UK sanctions include freezing of assets in the UK and ban on traveling to or transiting through the UK.

The Council of the European Union has imposed sanctions on him since 22 March 2021, pursuant to Council Regulation (EU) 2021/479 and Council Implementing Regulation (EU) 2021/480 which amended Council Regulation (EU) No 401/2013, for his responsibility for the military coup and the subsequent military and police repression against peaceful demonstrators. The EU sanctions include freezing of assets in member countries of the EU and ban on traveling or transiting to the countries.

Personal life 
Aung Lin Dwe is married to Ohn Mar Myint (b. 1967), and has two sons, Hlaing Bwar Aung (b. 1993) and Phyo Arkar Aung (b. 1995), and one daughter, Shwe Ye Phu Aung (b. 1990). His children own Aung Myint Moh Lin and Mingalar Aung Myay construction companies and the Shwe Yee Phyo Pyae production company, all of which have won significant government tenders since the 2021 military coup. Aung Lin Dwe's niece, Su Myat Nandar Aung (also known as Su Lin Shein) is a MRTV-4 actress.

See also 
 State Administration Council
 Tatmadaw

References 

1962 births
Living people
Burmese generals
Members of the State Administration Council
Specially Designated Nationals and Blocked Persons List
Defence Services Academy alumni
Individuals related to Myanmar sanctions